Royal Danish Academy may refer to:

The Royal Danish Academy of Music
The Royal Danish Academy of Sciences and Letters
The Royal Danish Academy of Fine Arts